Andrew Manley (born May 22, 1991) is an American football coach and former quarterback. Manley went to New Mexico State University and Eastern Illinois University, where he was the team's quarterback before joining the Alouettes in 2015. He was released by Montreal on July 28, 2015.

Manley then went on to begin his coaching career as the assistant OC for Coach June Jones at Kapolei High School on Oahu for one season. He was named the head football coach at Moanalua High School in January 2023.

References

1991 births
Living people
Montreal Alouettes players
Eastern Illinois Panthers football players
New Mexico State Aggies football players
American football quarterbacks